Stathmopoda trichrysa is a species of moth in the Stathmopodidae family. It is found on Fiji.

This larvae feed in the dry pods of Bauhinia monandra and Caesalpinia pidcherrima.

References

Moths described in 1920
Stathmopodidae